Mystus pelusius, is a species of catfish of the family Bagridae. It is native to Iraq, Turkey and Iran.

This species grows to a maximum length of 17 centimetres. It lives in rivers and ponds, often amidst vegetation in muddy waters. It is considered to be a rare species, but it has a wide distribution, so it is listed as a least-concern species on the IUCN Red List.

References 

Bagridae
Catfish of Asia
Freshwater fish of Turkey
Fish described in 1840